FlightGlobal is an online news and information website which covers the aviation and aerospace industries.

The website was established in February 2006 as the website of Flight International magazine, Airline Business, ACAS, Air Transport Intelligence (ATI), The Flight Collection and other services and directories.

FlightGlobal is a resource for aviation history with a picture library of over 1 million images starting with the foundation of Flight in 1909. Thousands of images and back copies of Flight are searchable online.

FlightGlobal won the prize for "Business Website of the Year" at the Association of Online Publishers' Digital Publishing Awards 2010. According to the contest judges, "The site uses the full spectrum of digital tools, with a special focus on engagement and effective use of social media in a B2B [business-to-business] environment".

In August 2019, FlightGlobal and its associated divisions (except analytics and consulting divisions, which were retained by RELX as Cirium) were sold to DVV Media Group.

History 
FlightGlobal publishes the long-established industry leading Flight International magazine, which marked its 110th anniversary in 2019, and established boardroom strategy title Airline Business, which entered its 35th year in 2020. It also produces multiple daily publications produced and circulated on site at air shows and key industry events globally, including the Paris and Farnborough air shows. In 2019, RELX rebranded Flight Global data and analytics services to Cirium.  FlightGlobal was part of Cirium, in a unit of Reed Business Information, until mid-2019 when it was acquired by DVV Media - a publisher of more than 80 brands, including magazines, newspapers, newsletters, books, directories and websites.

References

External links
 
 

 
Aerospace industry in England
Aviation websites
Internet properties established in 2006
Photo archives in the United Kingdom
Organisations based in the London Borough of Sutton
2006 establishments in England